Ivanaj is an Albanian surname that may refer to
Kreshnik Ivanaj (born 1982), Albanian football player
Mirash Ivanaj (1891–1953), Albanian politician, minister and school director 
Nikolla bey Ivanaj (1879–1951), Albanian publisher and writer 

Albanian-language surnames
Patronymic surnames
Surnames from given names